Wesley Barbosa De Morais (born 10 November 1981, in São Paulo), known simply as Wesley,  is a Brazilian footballer who plays for  Figueirense.

Career statistics
(Correct )

External links 

Wesley at ogol.com.br 

1981 births
Brazilian footballers
Association football forwards
Living people
K League 1 players
Jeonnam Dragons players
Gangwon FC players
Brazilian expatriate sportspeople in South Korea
Brazilian expatriate footballers
Expatriate footballers in South Korea
Itumbiara Esporte Clube players
Mirassol Futebol Clube players
Grêmio Barueri Futebol players
Clube Atlético Mineiro players
Atlético Clube Goianiense players
Figueirense FC players
Campeonato Brasileiro Série A players
Footballers from São Paulo